Bretenière is a commune in the Côte-d'Or department in eastern France.

Geography

Climate
Bretenière has a oceanic climate (Köppen climate classification Cfb).

Population

See also
Communes of the Côte-d'Or department

References

External links

Official site

Communes of Côte-d'Or
Côte-d'Or communes articles needing translation from French Wikipedia